Love on Ice was an American rock band based out of Portland, Oregon, United States, in the early 1990s. The members were Dan Krueger on vocals, Dirk Sullivan on guitar, Stan Robinson on drums, and bassist Brent Williams. After strong interest from their self-released four song demo, recorded at London Bridge Studios in Seattle, they released the album Nude on Interscope Records in 1992. They soon went back to London Bridge Studios to record their next record, but due to little support from Interscope Records, the album was shelved. The band broke up shortly after. The song "Showdown" was included in the film and on the soundtrack for Bill & Ted's Bogus Journey.

Members
Dan Krueger - vocals
Dirk Sullivan - guitar
Stan Robinson - drums
Brent Williams - bass on Nude
Bryce Hyder - bass on Love on Ice

Discography
Love On Ice Demo (Interscope Records)- 1990
 Foot In The Grave 4:35
 Sunshine Girl 4:59
 Backyard 4:02
 Showdown 7:35

Nude (Interscope Records/Eastwest Records)- 1992
 Don't Leave Me 3:18
 Leave Me Alone 3:02
 Goodbye 3:21
 Ugly 2:52
 Mine 4:06
 Bone Dance 3:33
 Sweet Thing 2:18
 Foot In The Grave 4:23
 Gone Away 4:05
 Country Boy 2:57
 Backyard 2:59
 Self In Blue 4:21
 Can O' Worms 1:33

References

External links
Best Bands You've Never Heard - Love On Ice

American alternative metal musical groups
Alternative rock groups from Oregon
Heavy metal musical groups from Oregon
Musical groups from Portland, Oregon
1990s establishments in Oregon
Musical groups established in the 1990s